Aharon Katzir (Aharon Katzir-Katchalsky)  (September 15, 1914 – May 30, 1972) was an Israeli pioneer in the study of the electrochemistry of biopolymers.

Biography
Born 1914 in Łódź, Poland, he moved to Mandatory Palestine in 1925, where he taught at the Hebrew University in Jerusalem. There, he adopted his Hebrew surname Katzir. He was a faculty member at the Weizmann Institute of Sciences, Rehovot, Israel as well as at the department of medical physics and biophysics at UC Berkeley, California.

He was murdered in a terrorist attack at Ben Gurion International Airport in 1972 in which 26 people were killed and 80 injured. His younger brother, Ephraim Katzir, became the President of Israel in 1973.

Awards and commemoration
 In 1961, Katzir was awarded the Israel Prize, in life sciences, together with his pupil, Ora Kedem.
 The State of Israel issued a postage stamp in memory of Katzir.
 The Katchalsky crater on the Moon is named after him.
 A series of Hebrew lectures is held at Tel Aviv University in memory of Katzir, organized by his son Avrahm, a professor of physics. It is named: In the Crucible of the Revolution (BeKur HaMahapecha), alluding to a popular book Katzir wrote about scientific progress. It has featured lectures by Nobel Prize laureates Daniel Kahneman and Aaron Ciechanover, and philosopher Hilary Putnam.
 A center at the Weizmann Institute of Science is named after Katzir, as well as public schools in Tel Aviv and elsewhere.
 A scholarship program of the Israeli Ministry of Defense is also named after him.

Textbooks
Katchalsky, Aharon; Curran, Peter F. (1965). Nonequilibrium Thermodynamics in Biophysics. Harvard University Press.

See also
 List of Israel Prize recipients
Science and technology in Israel

References

1914 births
1972 deaths
1972 murders in Israel
Academic staff of the Hebrew University of Jerusalem
Israel Prize in life sciences recipients who were biophysicists
Israel Prize in life sciences recipients
Israeli biophysicists
Israeli chemists
Jewish chemists
Members of the Israel Academy of Sciences and Humanities
Mass murder victims
Presidents of the Israel Academy of Sciences and Humanities
Foreign associates of the National Academy of Sciences
Polish emigrants to Mandatory Palestine
Israeli Ashkenazi Jews
Polish Ashkenazi Jews
Academic staff of Weizmann Institute of Science
People murdered in Israel
Deaths by firearm in Israel
Israeli murder victims
Israeli terrorism victims